Ceratophyllus arcuegens is a species of flea in the family Ceratophyllidae. It was described by George P. Holland in 1952.

References 

Ceratophyllidae
Insects described in 1952